The Roberts Cygnet is an American high-wing, cruciform tail, single-seat, glider that was designed and produced by Donald Roberts as a contender for the IGC World Class sailplane.

Design and development
The Cygnet was the sole US entrant in the competition for the World Class sailplane, losing out to the Polish Politechnika Warszawska PW-5. As a result only one Cygnet was completed. The prototype was finished and first flown in 1992

The aircraft is made from steel tubing and aluminium, with fiberglass fairings. Its  span wing employs a Somers-Maughmer SM701 airfoil and features balanced top and bottom DFS-style air brakes for glidepath control. A ballistic parachute was to be standard equipment.

Operational history
In August 2011 the sole Cygnet built was still listed on the US Federal Aviation Administration registry.

Specifications (Cygnet)

See also

References

External links
Photo of the Cygnet

1990s United States sailplanes
Cruciform tail aircraft
Aircraft first flown in 1992